

Mammals

References

1850s in paleontology
Paleontology